Bir Charitra is a Nepali fantasy novel written by Girish Ballabh Joshi. The complete all four parts of the novel was published only in 1965 (2022 BS) by Jagadamba Press. It is considered to be the first novel of Nepali literature.

Background 
Girish Ballav Joshi worked as a Kabiraj (Ayurvedic practitioner) in Rana palace. He was hugely influenced by the Hindi writer Devaki Nandan Khatri. Joshi even named his son ad Devaki Nath after Khatri. Khatri was one of the earliest Hindi novelist and was widely popular for his fantasy novel Chandrakanta. Joshi being influenced by Khatri wrote the novel of the similar genre. Even though only the first part of the novel was published in 1903, the novel became highly popular. 

The first part of the novel was published by Nara Dev Motikrishna Pashupat Press. It became popular among the women of the Rana courts and came under the notice of Rana officials. The Rana regime unofficially banned the publication of the other parts of the novel. Pashupat press refused to print the further part of the novel. Joshi was also stopped from writing the fifth part of the novel. However, the manuscript of the novel was passed among the readers. Many copies of the manuscript was produced.

Synopsis 
The novel is a satirical work on the Rana regime and is set in the western region of Nepal. The novel starts from the Baglung district of Nepal. It is an adventure of three princes in search of Agni Dutta, the son of a Brahmin named Ganesh Dutta. When Agni Dutta is kidnapped by a couple, Ganesh Dutta pleads the princes for their help. The novel contains various mythological creatures such as Rakshasa, demons, Nagas, etc. and fantasy elements alongside science fictions elements.

See also 

 Bhanubhakta Ramayana
 Madhabi

References 

1965 Nepalese novels
Nepali-language novels
20th-century Nepalese novels
Nepalese novels
Nepalese fantasy novels